The 1892 County Championship was the third officially organised running of the County Championship in cricket in England, and ran from 18 May to 27 August 1892. Surrey County Cricket Club claimed their third successive title by winning 13 of their 16 games. The match between Lancashire and Somerset at Old Trafford finished within one day, when Somerset were bowled out for 88 and 58.

Table
 One point was awarded for a win, and one point was taken away for each loss.

Leading averages

References

External links
1892 County Championship  at CricketArchive

1892 in English cricket
County Championship seasons
County